Oreta sanguinea is a moth in the family Drepanidae. It was described by Frederic Moore in 1879. It is found in north-eastern India, Sikkim and Tibet.

References

Moths described in 1879
Drepaninae